"Guns at Dawn" / "Ratpack" is a 2005 single by  English musician Baron featuring Pendulum.

Chart performance
"Guns at Dawn" / "Ratpack" entered the UK Singles Chart on week 17, 2005. It peaked at number 71 before dropping out a week later.

Formats and track listings 
These are the major formats and associated track listings of single releases of "Guns at Dawn" / "Ratpack".

12" vinyl single

A. "Guns at Dawn" – 5:44
AA. "Ratpack" – 4:23

12" picture disc

A. "Guns at Dawn" – 5:44
AA. "Ratpack" – 4:23

Personnel 
The following people contributed to "Guns at Dawn" / "Ratpack".

Baron – writer, producer, mixing
Pendulum – additional production on "Guns at Dawn"
Jack Adams – mastering

References 

2005 singles
Pendulum (drum and bass band) songs
2005 songs